The Speaker is the presiding officer of the Legislative Assembly of the Northwest Territories. The speakership has changed many times: from 1876 to 1888 the presiding officer of the assembly was the Lieutenant-Governor of the North-West Territories (with North-West hyphenated name used until 1906); however, Members of the Legislative Assembly would also elect one of their own to act as chairman. Elected members held the Speakership from 1888 until 1905. The Deputy Commissioner of the Territories became Speaker and held that role from 1921 until 1975, when it was returned to the elected members.

Speakers and presiding officers

Lieutenant-governors serving as presiding officer of the Council of the North-West Territories (1876–1888)
David Laird October 7, 1876 – December 3, 1881
Edgar Dewdney December 3, 1881 – July 1, 1888

Speakers of the North-West Legislative Assembly (1888–1905)
Herbert Charles Wilson 1888–1891
James Hamilton Ross 1891–1894
John Betts 1894–1898
William Eakin 1898–1902
Archibald Gillis 1902–1905

Deputy Commissioners serving as presiding officer of the 2nd Council of the Northwest Territories (1921–1975)
Roy A. Gibson June 16, 1921 – October 3, 1950
Frank J. G. Cunningham 	June 26, 1951 – April 10, 1957
Wilfred G. Brown 	April 10, 1957 – July 23, 1965
Stuart Milton Hodgson 	August 1, 1965 – March 1, 1967
John Havelock Parker 	March 2, 1967 –  April 30, 1975 (continued as Deputy Commissioner until April 14, 1979)

Speakers of the Legislative Assembly of the Northwest Territories (since 1975)
David Searle May 1, 1975 – November 13, 1979
Robert H. MacQuarrie November 13, 1979 – October 22, 1980
Donald Morton Stewart October 22, 1980 – November 12, 1987
Red Pedersen November 12, 1987 – October 18, 1989
Richard Nerysoo October 19, 1989 – November 13, 1991
Michael Ballantyne November 13, 1991 – November 10, 1993
Jeannie Marie-Jewell November 13, 1993 – December 15, 1994
Brian Lewis (Acting) December 15, 1994 – February 15, 1995
Samuel Gargan February 15, 1995 – January 18, 2000
Tony Whitford January 19, 2000 – December 11, 2003
David Krutko December 11, 2003 – June 1, 2004
Paul Delorey June 1, 2004 – October 3, 2011
Jackie Jacobson October 3, 2011 – November 23, 2015
Jackson Lafferty December 16, 2015 – October 24, 2019
Frederick Blake Jr October 24, 2019 – present

References

External links
History of the Northwest Territories legislative assembly 1876–1905
Northwest Territories speakers 1975 to present

Politics of the Northwest Territories
Northwest Territories